Francisco Javier 'Javi' Martínez Rodríguez (born 1 July 1988) is a Spanish retired footballer who played as a right midfielder.

Club career
Born in Seville, Andalusia, Martínez finished his youth career with local giants Sevilla FC. He made his senior debuts in 2007 with the C-team and, on 7 June 2009, played for Sevilla Atlético against SD Huesca in what was his first Segunda División appearance, featuring 90 minutes in the 0–3 away loss; in the following two Segunda División B seasons he was a regular starter for B's, scoring five goals in the first.

On 30 June 2011, Martínez was released by Sevilla and signed a deal with Huesca on 16 July. However, in the following transfer window, he cut ties with the latter club and joined Real Zaragoza B.

In September 2012, Martínez signed with Orihuela CF in the third level. He terminated his contract on 3 January of the following year, moving to Gimnàstic de Tarragona five days later.

On 30 December 2014, after struggling with injuries, Martínez was released. He signed for fellow league team CE L'Hospitalet on 12 January 2015 and, the ensuing summer, moved abroad for the first time at the age of 27, joining a host of compatriots at Europa FC from the Gibraltar Premier Division.

On 10 August 2016, Martínez announced his retirement at the age of 28.

References

External links

1988 births
Living people
Spanish footballers
Footballers from Seville
Association football midfielders
Segunda División players
Segunda División B players
Tercera División players
Sevilla FC C players
Sevilla Atlético players
SD Huesca footballers
Real Zaragoza B players
Orihuela CF players
Gimnàstic de Tarragona footballers
CE L'Hospitalet players
Gibraltar Premier Division players
Europa F.C. players
Spanish expatriate footballers
Expatriate footballers in Gibraltar
Spanish expatriate sportspeople in Gibraltar